Diagne is a Senegalese surname, and may refer to:

 Abdoulaye Diagne-Faye (born 1978), Senegalese professional footballer
 Blaise Diagne (1872–1934), Senegalese political leader
 Fama Diagne Sène (born 1969), Senegalese writer
 Mbaye Diagne (footballer) (born 1991), Senegalese professional footballer
 Raoul Diagne (1910–2002), French football defender
 Mbaye Diagne (1958–1994), Senegalese army officer
 Assane Diagne (1947–2013), Senegalese minister